Lotten is a Norwegian, and Swedish feminine given name that is a short form of Charlotte or Lieselotte, an alternate form of Lotte, and that is also related to Lisa, Elisa and Elisabeth. Notable people with the name include the following:

Given name
Lotten Andersson (born 1950), Swedish swimmer
Lotten Sjödén (born 1994), Swedish biathlete

Nickname
Lotten Edholm, nickname of Lovisa Christina Charlotta Edholm (1839 - 1930), Swedish composer and pioneer
Lotten fra Hegra, nickname of Anne Margrethe Strømsheim, née Bang, (1914 – 2008), Norwegian resistance member
Lotten von Düben, nickname of Carolina Charlotta Mariana von Düben, née von Bahr, (1828–1915) Swedish photographer
Lotten von Kræmer, nickname of Charlotte Louise von Kræmer (1828 – 1912), Swedish baroness, writer, poet, philanthropist and women's rights activist
Lotten Wennberg, nickname of Charlotta Christina Wennberg (1815 - 1864), Swedish philanthropist

See also

Losten (disambiguation)
Lotte (name)
Lotter (surname)

Notes

Norwegian feminine given names
Swedish feminine given names